The 2018 South Australian National Football League (SANFL) grand final was played at the Adelaide Oval on Sunday, 23 September to determine the premiers for the 2018 SANFL season.

The Grand Final was contested by Norwood and North Adelaide.

North Adelaide won the grand final, defeating Norwood by 19 points, winning their first premiership since 1991. The Jack Oatey Medal for the best player on the ground was won by Norwood's Mitch Grigg - the first member of a losing grand final side to win the medal.

This marked the highest scoring grand final since 1983, with both teams kicking over one hundred points.

Background 
Norwood were minor premiers, and progressed directly to the Grand Final by defeating Woodville-West Torrens in the Second Semi-final.

North Adelaide finished the minor round in fifth place, although only one and a half wins behind second place. They progressed to the Grand Final by successively defeating South Adelaide, Sturt and Woodville-West Torrens. A major incident in this latter match, the Preliminary Final, caused lingering uncertainty about the result. North Adelaide commenced the final quarter with 19 players on the field (one more than permitted under the rules), before correcting their error after "about five minutes." Woodville-West Torrens, being unaware of the situation, missed their only opportunity for redress: request that an umpire count the players and annul North Adelaide's score of 56 points to that stage. During those 5 minutes, North Adelaide advanced its score by 8 points, being greater than the final margin of 5 points (although North had led by as much 22 points). Michael David QC, sitting as the SANFL tribunal, later analysed events fully, and confirmed that there was no legal basis on which to disqualify North Adelaide, so the match result stood. On a charge of being "grossly negligent" he penalised North Adelaide $10,000 and 4 premiership points for the following season.

Teams 

Scorers: Barns 4.0, Harvey 3.2, McInerney 3.0, Woodcock 3.0, Hender 2.2, Ramsey 1.1, Sweet 1.1, Wilkie 1.0, Young 1.0, Olekalns 0.1, Thring 0.1, Tropiano 0.1, rushed 0.1

References

External links

 Player lists & match stats (SportsTG)

SANFL Grand Finals
SANFL Grand Final, 2018